Bankhead is a non-residential area of western Edinburgh, Scotland. It borders the Edinburgh City Bypass (A720) and Hermiston Gait (M8 motorway terminus) to the west, the Calders neighbourhood to the south – accessed via a pedestrian underpass, Sighthill to the east, and South Gyle/Edinburgh Park to the north. It is mostly occupied by a large industrial park. Amongst the companies here, Royal Mail and Burtons Biscuits have a large presence. Ethicon also had a plant here, but it has closed, and will reportedly be replaced by a sports facilities. Edinburgh College, the former Stevenson College and the Sighthill campus of Napier University are just to the west.

Transport

Road

City Bypass 
Junction 9: Calder
The dual-carriage Calder Road (A71) continues over the bypass here by means of a roundabout

Junction  10: Hermiston Gait
The M8 terminates here at a roundabout under the bypass with access to Hermiston Gait retail park.

Rail 
The main Edinburgh-Glasgow railway line passes along the northern boundary and is served by Edinburgh Park station.

Tram 
Bankhead tram stop is adjacently south of the railway line, close to the junction of Bankhead Drive and the South Gyle Access Road.

Buses

Lothian Buses 

 3, 25, 34, 35, X27, X28 (Calder Road) 
 36, 400 (Bankhead Avenue)
 2 (Bankhead Drive)
 21 (Broomhouse Road)

McGill's Scotland East 

 X22  (Calder Road)

 20, 63 (Bankhead Avenue)

References

Areas of Edinburgh
Edinburgh Trams stops
Industrial parks in the United Kingdom